Hussain Safar (born 6 May 1966) is a Kuwaiti judoka. He competed in the men's half-lightweight event at the 1988 Summer Olympics.

References

External links
 

1966 births
Living people
Kuwaiti male judoka
Olympic judoka of Kuwait
Judoka at the 1988 Summer Olympics
Place of birth missing (living people)